JP-4, or JP4 (for "Jet Propellant") was a jet fuel, specified in 1951 by the U.S. government (MIL-DTL-5624). Its NATO code is F-40. It is also known as avtag.

Usage
JP-4 was a 50-50 kerosene-gasoline blend. It had a lower flash point than JP-1, but was preferred because of its greater availability. It was the primary U.S. Air Force jet fuel between 1951 and 1995.

MC-77 is the Swedish military equivalent of JP-4.

Mixture

JP-4 was a mixture of aliphatic and aromatic hydrocarbons. It was a flammable transparent liquid with clear or straw color, and a kerosene-like smell. It evaporated easily and floated on water. Although it had a low flash point, a lit match dropped into JP-4 would not ignite the mixture.

JP-4 was a non-conductive liquid, prone to build up static electricity when being moved through pipes and tanks. As it is volatile and has a low flash point, the static discharge could cause a fire. Beginning in the mid-1980s an antistatic agent was added to the fuel to lower the charge buildup and decrease the corresponding risk of fires. Flow rates must be controlled, and all the equipment used must be electrically interconnected and well grounded.

Commercial aviation uses a similar mixture under the name Jet-B, though without the additional corrosion inhibitors and icing inhibitors included in JP-4.

Phase-out

The desire for a less flammable, less hazardous fuel led the U.S. Air Force to phase out JP-4 in favor of JP-8; the transition for USAF operations in Great Britain was made in 1979, and the change was completed throughout the USAF by the end of 1995.

See also
 JP-7
 JP-8
 JPTS
 Aviation fuel

Notes

References
 Faroon, Obaid; Mandell, Diane; Navarro, Hernan. Toxicological Profile for Jet Fuels JP-4 and JP-7. Agency for Toxic Substances and Disease Registry, Atlanta, June 1995.

Aviation fuels
1951 introductions